The Cottonwood-Oak Creek School District No. 6 (COCSD) is a school district in Arizona, United States, headquartered in Cottonwood. The district serves areas in Yavapai County, including Cottonwood and Cornville.

History
In 1878, the first school in Cottonwood was established and became Yavapai County School District #6. The first teacher, Mrs. Rubottom, lived in an old adobe building built by soldiers from Camp Verde when they supervised the captured Yavapai and Apache on the Rio Verde Reservation until 1875.

As Cottonwood grew, land was deeded for a school (and cemetery) in 1892. The Cottonwood School opened in 1909 serving students from ages 6–17 who had to carry water from a well 1.4 miles away.

From 1917 to 1923 the Bungalow School educated students whose parents worked for the United Verde Extension's mine and smelter in the company town of Clemenceau. In 1923, a modern public school was built by James Douglas, owner of the United Verde Extension, for $100,000, which still proudly stands today! The Clemenceau School brought all the students from grades 1 through 9 of Cottonwood together. High School students attended Clarkdale High School until 1947 when the Clemenceau building became a high school. Elementary students attended school in buildings next to the high school.

In 1954, Oak Creek School in Cornville joined with Cottonwood to form Cottonwood-Oak Creek School District # 6. That same year Yavapai County students from Sedona joined the Cottonwood-Oak Creek School District.

In 1958 Cottonwood and Clark/Jerome School Districts merged their high schools to form Mingus Union High School due to declining enrollment. That same year the Willard School, a small school for grades 1–8 in the area of Bridgeport was annexed into the new Cottonwood-Oak Creek School District.

Schools

Elementary schools:
 Dr. Daniel Bright Elementary School (Cottonwood)
 Cottonwood Education Services – Preschool & Special Education (Cottonwood)
 Cottonwood Community School (Cottonwood)
 Oak Creek Elementary School (– STEM Focused Cornville)
 Mountain View Preparatory School (MVP) – International Baccalaureate (Cottonwood)

References

External links

 

School districts in Arizona
School districts in Yavapai County, Arizona
1878 establishments in Arizona Territory
School districts established in 1878